Maria Maioru (born 1 June 1959) is a Romanian luger. She competed in the women's singles event at the 1980 Winter Olympics.

References

1959 births
Living people
Romanian female lugers
Olympic lugers of Romania
Lugers at the 1980 Winter Olympics
People from Sinaia